Wyoming PBS (formerly known as Wyoming Public Television) is the PBS member network in the U.S. state of Wyoming. It currently consists of flagship KCWC-DT (channel 4) in Lander (serving Riverton); full-power satellites KWYP-DT (channel 8) in Laramie (serving Cheyenne) and KPTW (channel 6) in Casper; and over 35 low-power translator stations across the state.

The network is operated by Central Wyoming College, a community college in Riverton which owns the licenses to all of the state's PBS stations, with studios located on the Central Wyoming College campus.

History 
Wyoming had been among the first states to begin the groundwork for a non-commercial educational/public television station, doing so in 1951, three years before any television station was on the air in the state. However, due to numerous delays, it would be several years before the idea even got beyond the planning stages. In the meantime, KRMA-TV in Denver brought PBS programming to much of the state on cable and via translators. Other parts of Wyoming were served by KTNE-TV in Alliance, Nebraska, part of the Nebraska ETV Network; and KUED and KBYU-TV in Salt Lake City. KRMA (now known as Rocky Mountain PBS) and KUED still operate several translators in Wyoming, as much of the southern portion of the state is considered part of the Denver and Salt Lake City markets.

Central Wyoming College applied for the channel 4 license in Riverton in the late 1970s. Before then, the college offered college programming through the Riverton cable system on channel 4 using its own head end modulator on campus. Programming was in black and white from 1971 to 1973 and very limited. Examples of shows included Riverton high school football, college basketball, on-campus lectures, and educational films. By the mid-1970s, the educational radio station got on air and work began on KCWC-TV for full color equipment and FCC licenses. They had to fight a commercial station in nearby Casper to keep the channel designated as non-commercial. After securing the largest single federal grant for a public television station at the time, KCWC-TV finally went on the air on May 10, 1983. This made Wyoming the next-to-last state to get a public television station on the air within its borders; CWC filed just days before Montana State University filed for KUSM in Bozeman, Montana; which went on the air over a year after KCWC.

Initially, KCWC's coverage was limited to Riverton and surrounding Fremont County. Over the years, however, it built translator after translator across the state, bringing its signal to 85% of Wyoming. This was not as problematic as it may seem; this expansion effort was done largely in conjunction with the state's cable systems. Even in the digital era, cable and satellite are all but essential for acceptable television in much of Wyoming. Sometime in the late 1980s or early 1990s, it adopted the on-air name of Wyoming Public Television to reflect its statewide reach.

KWYP-TV, the network's second full-power station, signed on in 2004. KPTW followed in March 2007.

On New Year's Day 2008, the state network rebranded as Wyoming PBS to celebrate its 25th anniversary on the air.

The switch to digital television greatly extended Wyoming PBS' reach. Since digital signals cover more territory than analog signals, Wyoming PBS now claims to reach 95 percent of the state.

The network has a very close relationship with Central Wyoming College. Broadcasting students help produce and direct many of the network's shows and pledge drives. As of 2019, they added the PBS Kids Channel to digital subchannel .3 on all of its stations.

Stations
The station's digital signal is multiplexed:

Notes:
1. KCWC-DT used the callsign KCWC-TV until October 7, 2009.
2. Because they were granted original construction permits after the FCC finalized the DTV allotment plan on April 21, 1997, these stations did not receive companion channels for digital television stations. Instead, on June 12, 2009, which was the end of the digital TV conversion period for full-service stations, KWYP-TV and KPTW were to be required to turn off their analog signals and turn on their digital signals (called a "flash-cut"). KPTW however, did change channels to 8 instead of 6.
3. KWYP-DT used the callsign KWYP-TV until October 7, 2009.

Additionally, KCWC is carried on the Casper Dish Network feed. However, KWYP is not available on the Cheyenne Dish Network feed; KTNE is the sole PBS station offered. This is due to a longstanding FCC regulation that defined a "local" channel as one whose main transmitter is in the area, not a repeater. Although state networks in other states have satellite stations carried on local satellite feeds, Dish interpreted this regulation as forbidding it from carrying KWYP on the Cheyenne feed (presumably because Laramie is geographically part of the Denver market). Wyoming PBS has pursued legislation that would allow states that suffer from severe fragmentation of their state by outside markets a chance to claim "local" for public broadcasters in a style of "within our state borders" if the public broadcaster is providing the service to the entire state. In response, Congress amended the Satellite Home Viewer Act to permit satellite carriers to carry statewide PBS networks to viewers in all counties in that state, regardless of what DMA the county was in.

Translators
Wyoming PBS operates a network of low-power translator stations across the state of Wyoming—one of the largest translator networks in the PBS system.

References

External links 
Wyoming PBS Website

PBS member networks
Television stations in Wyoming
Central Wyoming College